The Trafalgar Group is an opinion polling and survey company founded by Robert Cahaly and based in Atlanta, Georgia. It first publicly released polls in 2016. Trafalgar has been questioned for its methodology and for an apparent bias towards the Republican Party.

Notably, Trafalgar successfully predicted the result of the 2016 U.S. presidential election. 

They incorrectly predicted the result of the 2020 U.S. presidential election, releasing polls showing President Donald Trump leading in multiple key states that Joe Biden ultimately won. 

Trafalgar's polls for the 2022 midterms were inaccurate, predicting Republican wins or close races in multiple states where Republicans ended up losing by significant margins.

Method 
Trafalgar Group adjusts its polls for a "social desirability bias" effect, the hypothesized tendency of some voters to calibrate their responses to polls towards what they believe the survey taker would like to hear. It does this by not only asking respondents how they plan to vote, but also how they think their neighbors might vote.

According to The New York Times, there is almost no explanation of the Trafalgar Group's methodology: "the methods page on Trafalgar's website contains what reads like a vague advertisement of its services and explains that its polls actively confront social desirability bias, without giving specifics as to how." Responding to criticism of Trafalgar's polling methods and its lack of transparency about its methods, Cahaly said in November 2020, "I think we’ve developed something that’s very different from what other people do, and I really am not interested in telling people how we do it. Just judge us by whether we get it right." In presidential polling, Trafalgar Group only conducts state-level polls; according to Cahaly, "we don't do national polls, and that's for the same reason I don't keep up with hits in a baseball game: It's an irrelevant statistic".

Performance and accuracy

Before the 2020 election, FiveThirtyEight gave Trafalgar a grade of C−.

Afterwards, until March 2023, FiveThirtyEight had Trafalgar at a grade of A-.  

As of March 9th 2023, FiveThirtyEight has Trafalgar at a grade of B.

2016 US presidential election
During the 2016 United States presidential election, Trafalgar Group was the only polling firm showing Donald Trump winning the state of Michigan, which he ultimately did, and – according to RealClearPolitics – "nearly the only" one correctly predicting Trump's win in Pennsylvania. According to the New York Times, Trafalgar correctly predicted the number of electoral votes each candidate would receive, but not which states would provide those votes.

2018 US midterm elections
Trafalgar was an outlier in polling in the 2018 Georgia gubernatorial election, with its final poll showing Brian Kemp leading by 12 points, a race he ultimately won by less than two points; every other poll showed a one or two point difference in the race.

2020 US presidential election
Before the 2020 United States presidential election, Trafalgar Group said that Trump would win the election, estimating that he would win Arizona, Florida, Georgia, Michigan, Nevada, North Carolina, and Pennsylvania. Joe Biden won the election with 306 electoral votes and succeeded in winning Arizona, Georgia, Michigan, Nevada, and Pennsylvania. As to a number of swing states, Trafalgar's latest 2020 general election polls showed Trump winning Arizona by 3 points, Georgia by 4 points, Michigan by 3 points, Nevada by 1 point, and Pennsylvania by 2 points. However, Biden won Arizona by less than 1 point, Georgia by less than 1 point, Michigan by nearly 3 points, Nevada by approximately 2.5 points, and Pennsylvania by approximately 2 points.

2021 Georgia Senate runoff elections 
Leading up to the 2021 runoff elections Trafalgar Group showed both incumbents Kelly Loeffler and David Perdue initially ahead of Raphael Warnock and Jon Ossoff yet by December they were both trailing a few points behind. On January 5, 2021, the day before the 2 Georgia Senate runoff elections, Trafalgar predicted that Ossoff was leading by 0.9 points over Perdue and that incumbent Loeffler was leading 1.3 points over Raphael Warnock. Ossoff won by a margin of 1.2 and Loeffler lost by a margin of 2.1 percent.

2021 gubernatorial elections 
Aside from Fox News, Trafalgar had reported the most accurate poll in Virginia, predicting Glenn Youngkin would win by 2, which he did by 1.9. 

In New Jersey, Trafalgar had Phil Murphy winning the election but gave him the smallest margin of the polls, with only 4%, while Murphy won by 2.8%

2022 US midterm elections 
Trafalgar's polling numbers were considerably off in the 2022 United States midterm elections. Trafalgar's polls incorrectly suggested that Republican candidates such as Mehmet Oz, Herschel Walker, Tudor Dixon, and Blake Masters would all win. Their polls also suggested that Republican candidates such as Doug Mastriano, Joe O'Dea, and Tiffany Smiley, were within striking distance, but all lost in landslides.

See also
 Cahaly v. LaRosa

References

External links
 

Companies based in Atlanta
Polling companies
2016 United States presidential election